Ibrahim Kane (born 23 June 2000) is a Malian footballer who currently plays as a defender for Qingdao Hainiu, on loan from Ukrainian club Vorskla Poltava.

International career
He made his debut for Mali national football team on 11 June 2021 in a friendly against DR Congo.

Career statistics

Club

Notes

References

2000 births
Living people
Malian footballers
Malian expatriate footballers
Association football defenders
Ukrainian Premier League players
China League One players
FC Vorskla Poltava players
Qingdao Hainiu F.C. (1990) players
Expatriate footballers in Ukraine
Malian expatriate sportspeople in Ukraine
Expatriate footballers in China
Malian expatriate sportspeople in China
Mali youth international footballers
Mali international footballers
21st-century Malian people